GNOG is a 2017 puzzle video game, developed by KO_OP and published by Double Fine Presents for PlayStation 4, iOS, Microsoft Windows, and macOS.

Gameplay

Development
GNOG was developed by Montreal-based studio KO_OP. Originally titled "GNAH", the title was changed due to a trademark dispute. The game was showcased at the 2014 E3 "Horizon conference". It was shown at E3 2015 with a playable demo.

It was released on the PlayStation 4 on May 2, 2017, and on iOS on November 28 the same year. Later, on July 17, 2018, it became available via Steam on Windows and macOS as well.

Reception

GNOG received generally positive reviews from video game critics.

References

External links

2017 video games
IOS games
Indie video games
PlayStation 4 games
Puzzle video games
Video games developed in Canada
Windows games
Double Fine games
Virtual reality games
Valve Index games
HTC Vive games
Oculus Rift games